Events in the year 2021 in Puerto Rico.

Incumbents
 President: Donald Trump (R) (until January 20), Joe Biden (D) (starting January 20)
 Governor: Wanda Vázquez Garced (R) (until January 2), Pedro Pierluisi (D) (starting January 2)
 Resident Commissioner: Jenniffer González

Events

January to April
January 2 – Pedro Pierluisi, 61, is sworn in as the new governor.
January 5 – President Donald Trump announces $3.7 billion to rebuild water infrastructure. The grant  covers 90% of the estimated costs of the water and wastewater improvement projects.
January 24 – Governor Pedro Pierluisi declares a state of emergency over gender violence. The island saw 62 cases of femicide in 2020 and violence against members of the LGBTQ community.
February 1 – President Joe Biden signs an order providing $6.2 billion to Puerto Rico for disaster mitigation.
February 2 – The Health Department announces that for the next 28 days the COVID-19 vaccine will be exclusively for adults 65 years of age and older.
February 23 – Governor Pedro Pierluisi rejects a proposed debt settlement because of concerns about the effect on the territory′s pension system.
February 24 – A box containing 31 doses of COVID-19 vaccine is found on a street in Morovis. The vaccines had spoiled. Puerto Rico has reported at least 91,834 cases and 2,007 deaths from the virus.
March 12 – San Juan′s San José Church prepares for reopening after being closed in 1996 for restoration and repairs. The second-oldest church on the island, which was built in 1532 near the ocean on top of a Taíno settlement at the highest point of Old San Juan, was originally a Dominican convent where Bartolomé de las Casas lived.
March 23 – The United States Department of Education releases $912 million in federal funds that had been held up by the Trump administration.

March – 27 schools reopen for in-person classes after being shut for year due to the Covid-19 pandemic .
April 13 – Puerto Rican military veterans are onored on the first annual National Day of Borinqueneers.

Deaths
January 15 – Elizam Escobar, 72, art theorist, poet, and political activist, cancer.
February 16 – Ángel Mangual, 73, baseball player (Oakland Athletics, Pittsburgh Pirates), World Series champion (1972, 1973, 1974).
February 18 – Juan Pizarro, 84, baseball player, (Milwaukee Braves, Chicago White Sox), cancer.
February 26 – Ferdinand Vega, 84, Olympic archer (1972).
March 11 – Orlando Llenza, 90, military officer.
March 15 – Albert Rodriguez, 58, comedic actor.

See also

2021 in United States politics and government
2021 in Central America
2021 Atlantic hurricane season
2020s

References

External links
U.S. can break free of its dependence on China by rebuilding Puerto Rico’s pharmaceutical industry  (Opinion by Carlos Roa, Miami Herald, Jan. 4, 2021)
Don’t pretend statehood for Puerto Rico is the only choice. It’s not. Let all voices be heard (Opinion by Aníbal Acevedo-Vilá, The Miami Herald, February 1, 2021)

 
2020s in Puerto Rico
Years of the 21st century in Puerto Rico
Puerto Rico
Puerto Rico